CFAV Glendyne (YTB 640) is a Glen class naval tugboat operated by the Royal Canadian Navy. It was built at Yarrow Shipyard in Esquimalt, British Columbia. The ship was launched in 1975 and delivered on 8 August 1975. Attached to Maritime Forces Pacific, the ship is based at CFB Esquimalt.

References

Fleet of the Royal Canadian Navy
1975 ships
Glen-class tugs (1975)
Auxiliary ships of the Royal Canadian Navy